The Best Page in the Universe is a personal satirical humor website created by George Ouzounian, better known as Maddox, of Salt Lake City, Utah.

Launched in 1997 without any high expectations, the website was primarily a personal homepage for Maddox to host his writings while working as a telemarketer for a small software company. Over time, the website became popular enough to allow Maddox to leave his day job as a telemarketer and commit to writing full-time.

History and status
The Best Page in the Universe originated from a text document that Maddox wrote in 1996 named "fifty things that piss me off!". He gave the list to several people on EFnet's Internet Relay Chat channel #coders, and the positive response led him to create the website.

Maddox decided to name his site The Best Page in the Universe despite his knowledge that at the time Yahoo! blocked sites with the phrase "the best" in the title from inclusion in its search engine.

On July 15, 2009, Xmission.com, an ISP which hosts The Best Page in the Universe among other Utah clients, had an Alexa rank of about 16,000, declining to 77,000 by June 2017 and almost 300,000 by November 2021. TheBestPageInTheUniverse.net, an alternate domain for Maddox's website, had an Alexa rank of about 33,000 in 2009, 180,000 in 2017 and almost 2.4 million in 2021. Maddox attributes this change in traffic to his focus on launching the Madcast Media Network, a now defunct platform for notable internet personalities to launch bite-sized entertainment projects. Currently, Maddox entertains his dedicated fanbase with his irreverent livestreams featuring original characters such as Banandox and Oxmad.

Format and content
The Best Page in the Universe's layout was made sparse primarily to reduce bandwidth costs. Maddox also stated the sparsity protested the many websites containing "fancy HTML" but lacking substantial content. The page is headed with an image of Maddox's face superimposed over a bust of Che Guevara. In the image, Maddox is wearing a beret emblazoned with the Jolly Roger, and an eye patch. Maddox uses this image as a parody of the revolutionary icon. Maddox says that Che Guevara is remembered as "Che the revolutionary", not "Che the pinko", and claims to be neither socialist nor communist. Instead, he often proclaims himself to be a pirate, and typically portrays himself as such in his articles and artwork.

Maddox has compared reading black text on a white background to "staring at a light bulb". The site uses large, light-colored text on a black background to, in the stated opinion of Maddox, reduce strain on the eyes.

The site contains advertisements only for itself: it sells merchandise, such as stickers and apparel, that bear phrases from its articles. Maddox chose to not use advertisements because he thought they could end up censoring him by dropping ads.

Many of Maddox's articles include Microsoft Paint illustrations, with touch-up done in Adobe Photoshop. Images include elderly people being fired into the Sun, hippies being killed, and Maddox's testicles drawn larger than basketballs. Maddox maintains a section in which he criticizes hate mail his website has generated. When posting his replies he breaks the e-mail down and ridicules points which use fallacious logic and also corrects grammatical or orthographical errors. The site contains several "hidden pages", many of which are unfinished works or first drafts of articles that were moved around.

References

External links

 

Internet properties established in 1997
American comedy websites
Internet memes